Knebel may refer to:

People with the surname 
Andreas Knebel (born 1960), East German athlete who competed mainly in the 400 metres
Corey Knebel (born 1991), American professional baseball player
Fletcher Knebel (1911–1993), American author of several popular works of political fiction
Gottfried Knebel (born 1908), German botanist
John Albert Knebel (born 1936), United States Secretary of Agriculture 1976–1977
Joseph Knebel (1854–1926), Russian publisher
Karl Ludwig von Knebel (1744–1834), German poet and translator
Maren Knebel, German sprint canoeist who has competed since the mid-2000s
Maria Knebel (1898–1985), Russian actor, director, and teacher

Places 
Knebel, Denmark

See also
Knebelite, a silicate mineral